Steven James Parmenter is an English former professional footballer who played in the Football League for Bristol Rovers.

Parmenter played schoolboy football with Cambridge United and Ipswich Town before spending two years in the Southend United youth system. He was signed by Queens Park Rangers in 1995 and won a Football Combination league title with their reserve team, but never made an appearance for the first eleven. He signed for Bristol Rovers in the summer of 1996 and made his senior debut as a substitute against Stockport County on 31 August, in a game which also marked Rovers' first match back in Bristol after ten years of playing their home matches in Bath.

After his spell in Bristol ended in 1998, Parmenter played for a number of non-league clubs, most notably for Canvey Island where he spent six years and earned an FA Trophy-winner's medal in 2001.

Following his footballing career, he trained as a match official and as of 2020 was working as an assistant referee, officiating in Premier League 2, National League, and FA Women's Super League matches. Since 2015 he has been an officer in the Metropolitan Police.

References

1977 births
Living people
Sportspeople from Chelmsford
English footballers
Association football midfielders
Association football forwards
Bristol Rovers F.C. players
Yeovil Town F.C. players
Dorchester Town F.C. players
Kingstonian F.C. players
Canvey Island F.C. players
Wivenhoe Town F.C. players
Bishop's Stortford F.C. players
Cambridge City F.C. players
Braintree Town F.C. players
English Football League players
National League (English football) players
Wales under-21 international footballers
Metropolitan Police officers